A Street trading licence (England and Wales), known as a street trader's licence in Scotland, is a legal requirement to vend goods and services on the streets of the UK.

History
In England and Wales, street trading is governed by the Local Government (Miscellaneous Provisions) Act 1982. In Northern Ireland, street trading is regulated by the Street Trading Act (NI) 2001.

Legal requirement
Whether self-employed or an employee, a street trading licence is required to pursue the act of street trading in a public place from a kiosk, vehicle, or moveable stall. 

To acquire one you can be 17 or older. Street trading may not allowed during the early hours of the morning.

Exemptions
There are exemptions for selling:
 Milk
 Coal, or any solid fuel
 Public charitable collections, as regulated by section 119 of the Civic Government (Scotland) Act 1982

Market traders do not pay for street trading licences at licensed market venues.

Prohibitions
There are roads, listed by each district council, that you cannot sell from.

Applications
A street trading licence can cost around £150 to £500 for a year. Acquiring the licence can take several weeks from each district council, where it is decided by a Licensing Committee.

If the individual making the application has not lived in the UK for at least 10 years, then they need a Certificate of Good Conduct or Criminal Record Certificate from their country of origin.

See also
 Street food
 Street fundraising

References

External links
 England and Wales
 Scotland
 Rushcliffe Borough Council

Local government in the United Kingdom
Government documents of the United Kingdom
Licenses
Retailing in the United Kingdom
Street vendors
Streets in the United Kingdom